The men's discus throw at the 2022 World Athletics U20 Championships was held at Estadio Olímpico Pascual Guerrero on 5 and 6 August.

Records

Results

Qualification
The qualification round took place on 5 August, in two groups, bwith Group A starting at 9:25 and Group B starting at 10:25. Athletes attaining a mark of at least 60.50 metres ( Q ) or at least the 12 best performers ( q ) qualified for the final.

Final
The final was held on 6 August at 15:29.

References

discus throw
Discus throw at the World Athletics U20 Championships